Sergei Vladimirovich Vostokov (born April 13, 1945) is a Russian mathematician. He made major contributions to local number theory. He is a professor at St. Petersburg State University.

Work

Vostokov developed an important class of explicit formulas for the Hilbert symbol on local fields, which have a wide range of applications in number theory.

His formulas generalize to formal groups. A generalization of his explicit formula to higher local fields is called the Vostokov symbol. It plays an important role in higher local class field theory.

Prizes

For his 60th birthday, two special volumes of St Petersburg Mathematical Society of Vostokov were published in Russian and English by the American Mathematical Society.

In 2014 Vostokov was awarded the Chebyshev Prize.

Bibliography

Books

References

External links
 

1945 births
Living people
Russian mathematicians
Academic staff of Saint Petersburg State University